Royal Theatre or Royal Theater may refer to:

Venues

Australia
 Royal Theatre, Canberra

Belgium
 Royal Theatre of La Monnaie, Brussels
 Royal Park Theatre, Brussels
 Royal Flemish Theatre, Brussels

Canada
 Royal Theatre, Victoria, British Columbia
 Royal Alexandra Theatre, Toronto

Denmark
 Royal Danish Theatre, Copenhagen

France
 Théâtre Royal de Bourbon, Paris, destroyed in 1660 ("Royal Theater of Bourbon" in English)

Italy
 Teatro Regio, Parma ("Royal Theater" in English)
 Teatro Regio, Turin
 Teatro Regio Ducale, Milan, a predecessor of La Scala ("Royal Ducal Theater" in English)

The Netherlands
 Koninklijke Schouwburg, The Hague ("Royal Theater" in English)

Spain
 Teatro Real, Madrid ("Royal Theater" in English)

Sweden
 Royal Dramatic Theatre, Stockholm

United Kingdom
 Royal Theatre, Northampton, England
 Royal National Theatre, London, England
 Royal Shakespeare Theatre, Stratford-upon-Avon, England

United States

 Royal Theater, Danville, Indiana
 Royal Theatre, Benton, Arkansas, listed on the NRHP in Arkansas
 Royal Theater, St. Petersburg, Florida
 Royal Theater, Hogansville, Georgia, listed on the NRHP in Georgia
 Royal Theatre, Baltimore, Maryland, now demolished
 Royal Theater, New York City, a Yiddish theater built c. 1913–14, known as "Malvina Lobel's Royal Theater"
 Bernard B. Jacobs Theatre, New York City, formerly known as the "Royale Theatre" (from 1927 to 1932 and from 1940 to 2005)
 Royal Theater, Philadelphia, Pennsylvania, listed on the NRHP in Pennsylvania
 Scotland Royal Theater, Scotland, South Dakota, listed on the NRHP in South Dakota
 Royal Theatre, Ashland, Wisconsin, built in 1914 and part of the city's downtown Historic District

Other uses
The Royal Theatre, a 2004 album by the Scottish group Ballboy

See also
Theatre Royal (disambiguation)
Teatro Regio (disambiguation)